Knock (meaning  The Hill – but now more generally known in Irish as Cnoc Mhuire, "Hill of (the Virgin) Mary") is a large village in County Mayo, Ireland. Its notability is derived from the Knock Shrine, a Catholic shrine and place of pilgrimage where, according to Catholic beliefs, that the Blessed Virgin Mary, Saint Joseph and Saint John the Evangelist may have appeared on 21 August 1879. There is much international skepticism on this event due to the age of the witnesses and lack of evidence supporting the event. In the 20th century, Knock became one of Europe's major Catholic Marian shrines, alongside Lourdes and Fatima. It was one of the focusses of Irish peace pilgrimage during the Second World War, when the Catholic Irish prayed for peace and to prevent the spread of war to the island. One and a half million pilgrims visit Knock Shrine annually. Pope John Paul II, a supporter of devotion to the Virgin Mary, visited Knock in 1979 to commemorate the centenary of the apparition. 
Knock is also a civil parish in the ancient barony of Costello.

On 26 August 2018 Pope Francis visited the shrine at Knock as part of a visit to Ireland for the 9th World Meeting of Families.

Name
Knock comes from the Irish word "cnoc" meaning hill, historical evidence shows the village had been named that as far back as 1625. The Irish language name was changed to "Cnoc Mhuire" meaning the hill of the Virgin Mary after the visions. The parish and village of Knock is sometimes referred to historically and in Lewis' 1837 topographical dictionary as Knockdrumcalry (Cnoc Droma Chálraighe) meaning "hill of the ridge of the Cálraighe".

History
The civil parish of Knock covers 45 townlands. Thirty five of the townlands are in the barony of Costello. The remaining 10 townlands along the central western boundary of the parish are in the neighbouring barony of Clanmorris. Knock is located five miles from the town of Claremorris (one of the major market towns of the early 19th century) and is between Claremorris and Ballyhaunis.

Monsignor James Horan
Monsignor James Horan (1911–1986) became parish priest of Knock in 1963. During his tenure his accomplishments included the construction of a new 10,000 capacity basilica, Our Lady, Queen of Ireland, at Knock Shrine in 1967. He was also involved in the construction of Ireland-West Airport, and a visit by Pope John Paul II to Knock in 1979 to commemorate the centenary of the apparition.

Education
The local primary school is Knock National School, built in 1966.

Sport
The local soccer club is Kiltimagh Knock United F.C. established in 2002. Their ground, CMS Park, is situated in Cloonlee on the Knock/Kiltimagh Road, 3 km from the village. There is no other sports club located in the parish area and players from the village often play for neighbouring clubs.

Transport
Ireland West Airport Knock, which is located 19 km (12 miles) to the north of the village on the N17 road near Charlestown, was opened by Monsignor James Horan on 30 May 1986 and has been an important tourism boost for the village and shrine.

See also
 Knock basilica, The Basilica of Our Lady, Queen of Ireland
 List of towns and villages in Ireland
 Marian apparition

References

Further reading
 Peter H. Görg, Das Wunder von Knock - Die Erscheinung der Jungfrau Maria in Irland in Zeiten sozialer Not, Illertissen 2010.
 Tom Neary, I Saw Our Lady, Knock, 156 p.
 John Scally, I Was Cured at Knock - The extraordinary story of an extraordinary woman, Knock 2005, 127 p.
 Ethna Kennedy (Ed.), Judy Coyne   Providence My Guide. The heroic force in the Knock Shrine story, Knock, 254 p.
 The Custodians of Knock Shrine (Ed.), Knock – Heiligtum Unserer Lieben Frau. Leitfaden für Wallfahrer, Knock.
 Fr. Berchmans Walsh OCSO, Knock   Mary's International Shrine of the Lamb of God, Knock, 16 p.
 Sean Egan & Tom Neary (Ed.), Knock Parish Church - 1828-2006, Knock 2006, 24 p.
 Knock Shrine Society (Ed.), Knock Shrine Annual, Knock 1938ff.
 The Custodians of Knock Shrine (Ed.), Knock Shrine. A Pilgrim’s Guide Book, Englisch, Französisch, Deutsch, Spanisch, Italienisch, Knock, 26 p.
 Fr. Hubert OFMCap., Knock - Vision of Hope, Knock, 36 p.
 Tom Lane CM, Reflecting at Knock Before our Merciful Lamb, Knock, 127 p.
 Msgr. Michael Walsh, The Apparition at Knock - A Critical Analysis of Facts and Evidence, Knock, 1955 
 Msgr. Michael Walsh, The Glory of Knock, Knock 2000, 51 p.
 Donal Flanagan (Hrsg.), The Meaning of Knock, Knock 1997.
 Mary Francis Clare Cusack, Three Visits to Knock, New York 1882.

External links
 Knock Shrine
 Knock, Co Mayo
 Ireland-West Airport, Knock

 
Towns and villages in County Mayo